Colossians 2 is the second chapter of the Epistle to the Colossians in the New Testament of the Christian Bible. Traditionally, it is believed to have been written for the churches in Colossae and Laodicea (see ) by Apostle Paul, with Timothy as his co-author, while he was in prison in Ephesus (years 53–54), although there are debatable claims that it is the work of a secondary imitator, or that it was written in Rome (in the early 60s). This chapter continues the exposition about the 'Servant of the Mystery' and the warning against errors.

Text

The original text was written in Koine Greek. This chapter is divided into 23 verses.

Textual witnesses
Some early manuscripts containing the text of this chapter are:
Papyrus 46 (c. AD 200)
Codex Vaticanus (325-350)
Codex Sinaiticus (330-360)
Codex Alexandrinus (400-440)
Codex Ephraemi Rescriptus (c. 450; complete)
Codex Freerianus (c. 450; extant verses 7–9, 16–19)
Codex Claromontanus (c. 550; in Greek and Latin )
Codex Coislinianus (c. 550; extant verses 1–8, 20–23)

Servant of the Mystery (2:1-5)
This section continues from chapter 1:24, dealing with Paul's sufferings which "reveal the present reality of grace" as a member of the body of Christ.

Verses 1–3
For I want you to know what a great conflict I have for you and those in Laodicea, and for as many as have not seen my face in the flesh, that their hearts may be encouraged, being knit together in love, and attaining to all riches of the full assurance of understanding, to the knowledge of the mystery of God, both of the Father and of Christ, in whom are hidden all the treasures of wisdom and knowledge.
For "conflict", or the Greek word αγωνα (agōna), the Revised Geneva Translation speaks of a "great struggle", and Johann Bengel speaks of "anxiety, eager desire [and] prayers".

Warning against errors (2:6-23)
Paul warns the Colossians not to accept human speculation, regress to the religious perspectives common to fallen humanity, or return to the "domain of darkness" (cf. ), whereas their original commitment is to Jesus the Lord and the truth of Christ.

Verses 6–7
 As you therefore have received Christ Jesus the Lord, so walk in Him, rooted and built up in Him and established in the faith, as you have been taught, abounding in it with thanksgiving.
"Christ Jesus the Lord": this expression is only found here and in Ephesians 3:11 in the whole Bible.

Verse 8
 Beware lest anyone cheat you through philosophy and empty deceit, according to the tradition of men, according to the basic principles of the world, and not according to Christ.
"Cheat you": lit. "plunder you" or "take you captive".

Verse 9
 For in Him dwells all the fullness of the Godhead bodily;
"Bodily": or "in bodily form".

Verse 11
 In Him you were also circumcised with the circumcision made without hands, by putting off the body of the sins of the flesh, by the circumcision of Christ,

 "In Him you were also circumcised" (KJV: "In whom also ye are circumcised"): This is applied to the non-Jew Christians to counter the objection by the Jews that they were not circumcised, because of the high significance of circumcision in Judaism. Paul counters this objection by stating that they were circumcised in Christ, who is their sanctification.
 "With the circumcision made without hands": which is that of the heart, in the spirit.
 "In putting off the body of the sins of the flesh": the Vulgate Latin, the Alexandrian versions and some others leave out the word "sins"; and the Syriac version omits the word "body". "The flesh" points to the corrupt nature (born of the flesh), which propagates in a carnal way, to be the source of all sin. "The sins" consist of various parts and members, as a body does; being united together, and receiving frequent additions, committed and yielded to by the members of the natural body.
 "By the circumcision of Christ": not the one at eight days old, that was performed to fulfill all the righteousness, but the one by his Spirit.

See also
 Circumcision
 Jesus Christ
 Laodicea
 Philosophy
 Related Bible parts: Genesis 17, Deuteronomy 10, Deuteronomy 30, Romans 1, Romans 2, 1 Corinthians 1, 2 Corinthians 10, Colossians 1, 2 Timothy 3, Jude, 2 Peter 2

References

Bibliography

External links
 King James Bible - Wikisource
English Translation with Parallel Latin Vulgate
Online Bible at GospelHall.org (ESV, KJV, Darby, American Standard Version, Bible in Basic English)
Multiple bible versions at Bible Gateway (NKJV, NIV, NRSV etc.)

02